Angry Birds Seasons (formerly Angry Birds Halloween) is the second puzzle video game in the Angry Birds series, developed by Rovio Entertainment. Based on Angry Birds, Angry Birds Seasons was released for devices using Apple's iOS in October 2010 and then it was released on other platforms starting in December 2010.  There have been no new releases since the release of Ragnahog on December 1, 2016 and it was removed from App Store and Google Play in 2019,  after the launch of Angry Birds Seasons with all other Angry Birds games released before Angry Birds Transformers except for Angry Birds Friends.  However, Bad Piggies was added back in 2020.

Gameplay
Just as in the original Angry Birds, players use a slingshot to launch an assortment of birds at nearby structures, with the intent of hitting targets located on or within them. The main targets are the pigs, and they can be defeated if directly fired at, or through other strategies, e.g.: the bird hits a structure that falls on the pig, defeating it. Small sized pigs are weak and easily defeated, while bigger pigs can sustain more damage. Each level pack represents a different "season", often based upon different themes and holidays. Different level packs have each unique theme and sometimes much different gameplay.

Release

2010

Levels

The first season began in October 2010, when Rovio released a Halloween edition. Angry Birds Halloween, exclusive to iOS at the time and a separate game, included levels with Halloween-themed music and graphics. On December 1, 2010, Rovio changed the name to Angry Birds Seasons to iOS, Android, and Symbian 3 devices. Seasons introduced 25 Christmas-themed levels, one for each day leading to the holiday, similar to an Advent calendar. All versions include the previously-exclusive Halloween levels and are offered as separate, stand-alone paid applications, with the exception of the free, ad-supported Android version; Angry Birds Halloween users on iOS received the Seasons levels as a free upgrade. The Halloween version was given the episode title "Trick or Treat", while the Christmas episode was entitled "Season's Greedings".

2011

Levels

The second season began in February 2011, when Rovio released a Valentine's Day update to Angry Birds Seasons, entitled "Hogs and Kisses", complete with new themed levels and graphics, as well as the option to send Angry Birds-themed Valentine's Day messages through Facebook. In March 2011, Rovio released a new St. Patrick's Day update, entitled "Go Green, Get Lucky"; followed by an Easter update, entitled "Easter Eggs", in April 2011; and a summer update, "Summer Pignic", in June 2011. In September 2011, "Moon Festival" (originally “Mooncake Festival”) was released in conjunction with the Chinese Mid-Autumn Festival. In October 2011, we move on with the new season with another Halloween update, "Ham'O'Ween" was released and introduced a new orange bird, known as Bubbles. In December 2011, "Wreck the Halls" was released with 25 Christmas-theme levels also arranged in an Advent calendar setting.

2012

Levels

The third season began in January 2012, when "Year of the Dragon" was released; it is about Chinese New Year. It features the replacement of the Mighty Eagle, the Mighty Dragon, that loops out the structures and defeats all the pigs; it is free to use. A Japanese Cherry Blossom episode was announced on February 28, 2012, with a release date on March 7, 2012. In June 2012, Angry Birds Seasons added their twelfth episode, Piglantis. It was launched on June 14 and is the second summer based episode (the first episode being Summer Pignic). The main new feature in Angry Birds: Piglantis is fluid physics: the birds, wood, and glass are buoyant in the water levels; however, the pigs and stone are too heavy to rise to the surface and sink down until they are defeated.  In August 2012, "Back to School" was added, which introduces the pink bird, Stella and it’s Back To School Day. In October 2012 when Haunted Hogs was released and was the third Halloween episode in the series. It added ghost blocks, which is visible to all items except the birds and the pigs unless they are inside them. On December 1, Winter Wonderham was released and was the third Christmas episode in the series. Like the other Christmas episodes, it is set up as an advent calendar. It introduced slippery blue ice, that makes wood, ice, stone, birds, and pigs slip on contact.

2013

Levels

The fourth season began in May 2013, when Abra-Ca-Bacon based on World Circus Day was released; it has a magician theme and features magic portals, which can teleport materials, birds, or pigs from one portal to another. In December 2013, Arctic Eggspedition was released, the fourth Christmas episode, and it is once again set up as an advent calendar with one level unlocked per day or all unlocked with an in-app purchase. The fourth season is the shortest episode in Seasons, with just two episodes.

2014

Levels

The fifth season began in July 2014 with a third summer-themed episode, South Hamerica and Pig Days, an episode that has weekly unlocked levels. With this update, the seasons were renamed showing the release year, such as "Season 2011". On October 9, 2014, the game has been updated with "Ham Dunk", in celebration of the NBA Championships. On October 27, 2014, the Visit Finland Twitter account unveiled an image displaying Terence swimming on a pool along a similar looking bird, colored blue, named "Tony the Blue", and the title "On Finn Ice", which is the fifth Christmas episode. The tweet also referred to the Finnish band Apocalyptica, who play the theme music for that episode.  With this update, the episodes were arranged to the year they were released, not as it was previously; the "Winter Wonderham" episode, which was in the fourth season, was moved to the third season, as the episode was released in 2012.

2015

Levels

The sixth season began in February 2015, a second part of Ham Dunk was added as All-Star Weekend 2015, expanding the world to 60 levels (more than Trick or Treat, which has 45). This update allowed the player to use Shockwave (electrical Bomb) for free, but only in Ham Dunk and for a limited time. At the extreme end of April (the 30th), a tropical world set on an unspecified Pacific island. The world was added in commemoration to Rovio's partnership with BirdLife International to save the birds of the Pacific, an episode based on Spring Break, “Tropigal Paradise”. About a month later (June), a third Ham Dunk update, celebrating The Finals, was added- ultimately expanding the total levels of Ham Dunk to 67. Between this update and the next was about 4 months, giving Rovio a "rest" and letting them handle other Angry Birds games. In October 2015, we returned to another Halloween episode but with some biggest changes with 50's movie-themed world was added to the selection, titled "Invasion of the Egg Snatchers", which not only brought a new world, but BirdWear (costumes), which are unlocked in a scavenger hunt style, having the player search through levels they completed for certain items, and once 3 items were found (there is a 16-hour wait between obtaining items and an eight-hour wait to get a new mission), they would receive the costume, allowing the birds to (optionally) wear outfits during gameplay. Another new feature in the update was the Power-Up Test Zone, which lets the player test Power-Ups (with infinite uses). Finally, to wrap up 2015 to end with a Christmas episode, "Ski or Squeal" was added (in the usual advent calendar style), taking place a top a frigid mountain summit.

2016

Levels

The seventh season began on February 11, 2016, a Valentine's Day episode was released, entitled "Fairy Hogmother", which is set in a fairytale storybook, featuring magic wands that trigger actions when hit, and (strangely) imprisoned Birds that give the player an extra Bird when the cage (holding the Bird) is destroyed. As spring rolled around about a month later, a new episode was released, called "Marie Hamtionette" where we celebrate Versailles Festival (after Marie Antoinette, queen of France in the 1700s), which is set in the garden of Ludpig XVI's (Louis XVI) estate, complete with hedges and topiarys across a wide landscape. On June 27, 2016, summer 2016 kicked off with a new summer-themed world entitled "Summer Camp", which is (hence the name) a summer camp set in a mountainous forest at dawn, including many popular activities one would find at a camp, including human swimming, archery, rock climbing, and many more popular summer activities. The summer 2016 update also added a new mode to the course of gameplay, "The Pig Challenge", which is set in a tournament style format, having players compete against friends and other players in a randomized set of weekly levels for trophies and power-ups. Fall 2016 started with "Piggywood Studios" where the Pigs reenact famous movie scenes from Indiana Jones, King Kong, The Angry Birds Movie, Aliens, Back to the Future, and more. It’s the whole event of Hollywood Film Festival. It continued with the Halloween episode "Hammier Things", which was based on TV series Stranger Things, and concluded with the Christmas episode "Ragnahog", which is also an vikings theme and is set in a Nordic theme. It’s also the final episode of Angry Birds Seasons.

Special Items

Levels

Like the original game, all episodes have an item representing them which are flying around on the main menu screen once the episode is complete. For example, completing Winter Wonderham awards the player with a star-shaped cookie.

Ports
At E3 2012 in Los Angeles, Rovio and distribution partner Activision announced plans to bring Angry Birds Seasons, along with the original Angry Birds and Angry Birds Rio, to the PlayStation 3, Xbox 360, and Nintendo 3DS systems. Bundled together as Angry Birds Trilogy, the games were built specifically for their respective consoles, taking advantage of their unique features, such as support for PlayStation Move, Kinect, high-definition displays, and glasses-free 3D visuals. The trilogy was also available for Wii and Wii U.

Reception

The reception of Angry Birds Seasons has been positive. Tracy Erickson of Pocket Gamer said about the Halloween update, "The difficulty is steeper than in the original Angry Birds, which is likely an intentional consideration for those well-versed in the first game. This doesn't make Angry Birds Halloween unapproachable, but it does result in an undesirable increase in trial-and-error gameplay. Without the experience of playing the original, you can anticipate having to replay a lot of stages." He further mentioned, "Of course, these structural issues don't detract from what remains an entertaining game. Angry Birds Halloween is pleasantly more of the same, though you're best served by playing the original before tackling this holiday treat." Sarah Jacobsson of Macworld said about the Christmas update, "Unlike the original Angry Birds and Angry Birds Halloween, the Season’s Greetings track does not start out with a laughably easy level—after all, you only get one level a day, and Rovio wants to make you work for it." She further wrote, "Angry Birds Seasons brings fun, Christmas spirit to the most popular iOS game of the year. With the included Halloween track, you get a total of 69 challenging levels—definitely worth $0.99 (Angry Birds Seasons HD is $1.99)." Abigail Holden of Lazygamer rated the game 8.5/10, saying, "Whether you're new to Angry Birds or you've enjoyed the game on other platforms, Angry Birds Seasons for PC is worth to look at.

See also

 List of most downloaded Android applications

References

External links

 

2010 video games
Android (operating system) games
Seasons
BlackBerry 10 games
Christmas video games
Delisted digital-only games
Halloween video games
IOS games
MacOS games
Products and services discontinued in 2019
Puzzle video games
Rovio Entertainment games
Symbian games
Video games developed in Finland
WebOS games
Windows games
Windows Phone games
Single-player video games